Moțăieni is a commune in Dâmbovița County, Muntenia, Romania with a population of 2,307 people. It is composed of two villages, Cucuteni and Moțăieni.

References

Communes in Dâmbovița County
Localities in Muntenia